The R281 road is a regional road in Ireland linking Kinlough and Glenfarne in County Leitrim.

From Kinlough the road passes along the south shore of Lough Melvin before joining the R282 near Rossinver. After about  the R281 leaves the R282 towards Kiltyclogher. In Kiltyclogher, a monument to Seán Mac Diarmada, a leader of the 1916 Easter Rising, occupies the roundabout junction with the R283. From here the road continues southeast to end in Glenfarne.

See also
Roads in Ireland

References

Regional roads in the Republic of Ireland
Roads in County Leitrim